is a Japanese male curler.

Teams

References

External links

Living people
1985 births
People from Kitami, Hokkaido
Sportspeople from Hokkaido
Japanese male curlers